Zábřeh is a town in the Olomouc Region, Czech Republic.

Zábřeh may also refer to:

Zábřeh, a village and administrative part of Dolní Benešov, Czech Republic
Zábřeh, a district and administrative part of Ostrava, Czech Republic

See also
Zabrzeg